The Florida Film Critics Circle Award for Best Picture is an award given by the Florida Film Critics Circle (FFCC) to honor the finest achievements in filmmaking. The FFCC is an organization of film critics and writers from Florida-based print and online publications. Founded in 1996, the FFCC strives to recognize outstanding work in film, further the cause of good movies, and maintain the highest level of professionalism among film critics in Florida.

Winners
 † = Winner of the Academy Award for Best Picture

1990s

2000s

2010s

2020s

References

External links
 

Awards for best film
Lists of films by award
Florida Film Critics Circle Awards